The States Navy was fleet of warships that constituted the naval military arm of the Dutch Republic from 1588 to 1795.  This fleet was not comparable to the present navies or even its contemporary naval adversaries such as the Spanish Navy, the Royal Navy or the French Navy.  There was no central organization that held a solid navy with permanent crew into service.  The ships were delivered by the five admiralties, making the regional impact large.  Furthermore, armed merchantmen were also an important part of the fleet during wartime. Yet, the fleet managed to preserve Dutch independence,maintain a world-wide trading empire, and meet its adversaries or more than equal footing (see Naval history of the Netherlands).  It modern successor is the Royal Netherlands Navy.

Genesis 

Naval policy in the Netherlands was originally decentralized.  Each port area would fit out fleets to combat pirates and other threats to navigation paid for by the local merchants.  The title of Admiral (from the Arab emir-al-bahr), for naval commanders of ships which protected commercial convoys against piracy already existed temporary in the different parts of the Low Countries.  It was Louis II of Flanders who first appointed a permanent government official called admiral in Flanders at Dunkirk in 1383 with responsibilities and funding from the central government.

The Burgundian and Habsburg rulers started a central policy of a naval organization, defense and offense. In 1488 they established an Admiralty of the Netherlands at Veere by the Ordinance on the Admiralty issued 8 January. The admiralty of Flanders was made a vice-admiralty and subordinated to the Admiralty at Veere.

Still, the interests of the central government did not always match those of the regions, so that the regions regularly sent our their own fleets.

Uprising 

The Dutch Navy began with and traces its roots back to the Sea Beggars.

In 1569 William of Orange, who had now openly placed himself at the head of the party of revolt, granted letters of marque as monarch of the sovereign Principality of Orange, to a number of vessels manned by crews of desperadoes drawn from all nationalities. Eighteen ships received letters of marque, which were equipped under his brother, Louis of Nassau, in the French Huguenot port of La Rochelle.  They were called  "Sea Beggars", "Gueux de mer" in French, or "Watergeuzen" in Dutch.  The Sea Beggars continued to use La Rochelle as a base, as well as English Ports. By the end of 1569, already 84 Sea Beggars ships were in action.  The Sea Beggars were also adept at land borne operations, which made capturing coastal cities attractive.

They were under the command of a succession of daring and reckless leaders, the best-known of whom is William de la Marck, Lord of Lumey,  At first they were content merely to plunder both by sea and land, carrying their booty to the English ports where they were able to refit and replenish their stores.  However, in 1572, Queen Elizabeth I of England, seeking to placate Philip II of Spain, abruptly refused to admit the Sea Beggars to her harbours. No longer having refuge, the Sea Beggars, under the command of Willem Bloys van Treslong, made a desperate attack upon Brielle, which they seized by surprise in the absence of the Spanish garrison on 1 April 1572. Encouraged by this success, they now sailed to the larger port of Vlissingen, which was also taken by a coup de main. The capture of these two towns prompted several nearby towns to declare for revolt, starting a chain reaction that resulted in the majority of Holland joining in a general revolt of the Netherlands, and is regarded as the real beginning of Dutch independence.

In 1573 the Sea Beggars defeated a Spanish squadron under the command of Admiral Bossu off the port of Hoorn in the Battle on the Zuiderzee. Mixing with the native population, they quickly sparked rebellions against Spanish Rule and the Spanish Governor-General of the Netherlands,the Duke of Alba, in town after town and spread the resistance southward.

Some of the forefathers of the Dutch naval heroes began their naval careers as Sea Beggars, such as Evert Heindricxzen, the grandfather of Cornelis Evertsen the Elder.

Admiralities

see Admiralties (Dutch)

The success of the Dutch Revolt required a better system of naval governance.  In 1586, the then governor-general, Robert Dudley, 1st Earl of Leicester, established a new instruction for the Admiralty.  Based on this new instruction, the admiralty councils in Veere, Rotterdam and Hoorn were founded.  An admiralty council was also founded in Ostend.  Ostend, however, was since 1572 under the influence of Zeeland, and under pressure from Zeeland, this admiralty was abolished in the following year.  After the three-year siege of Ostend, the city's admiralty was put under the Dunkirk Admiralty founded by Parma in 1583.

In 1596 there was an attempt by  the States-General to centralize the administration of the navy in the form of one College of Admiralty consisting of delegates from all the provinces.  Provincial particularism, however, ensured that months later this was cast aside.  The competition between the differing admiralties became so grim that Zeeland and Holland impounded each other's ships, and Elizabeth I of England tried to broker a reconciliation.  On 13 August 1597 the States-General issue an Instruction for the Admiralties which established the management of naval affairs for the Republic until 1795.  Within a few years were five different admiralty colleges located at

 Admiralty of the Maas (Rotterdam)
 Admiralty of Amsterdam
 Admiralty of Zeeland (Middleburg)
 Admiralty of Friesland (Dokkum, after 1645 Harlingen)
 Admiralty of the Noorderkwartier (alternating Hoorn and Enkhuizen)

The Admiralty colleges were governed by the Lord Councils in Admiralty or just Council of the Admiralty.  As Stadholder, the princes of Orange that succeeded Maurice were also appointed to his offices and so were Admiral General of the Union and chairman of the colleges.  Through this mechanism they were able to provide central control and coordination to naval affairs.  The prince was represented in each college by a lieutenant-admiral, who was assisted by a judge-advocate and a secretary.  If there was no Stadholder - as between 1650 and 1672 - the States-General had the final responsibility.  In practice, therefore, this concentrated that supervisory power in the councilor pensionary of Holland. Although the Admiralty colleges were organs of the Union and thus accountable to the State-General, the bodies were regional.  The regions had a lot of influence, despite the joint meetings in The Hague and the influence of the Prince of Orange and/or the councilor pensionary of Holland.  As the admiralty with the most money and fitting out the most ships, the Admiralty of Amsterdam had the most influence.

The Admiralty colleges had the task of protecting coastal waters and the commercial fleet, which included the Dutch East India Copmany fleet.  To support this, they had the power to levy tax funds through convoys and licenses (import and export duties) and thus pay for the equipment of the navy.  The other main task of the admiralties was to build, maintain and equip the navy. The admiralties were also entitled to act as judge in disputes and as a prize court.  The admiralties independently nominated and commissioned junior officers.  Flag officers and captains were appointed by the States-General, on the recommendation of the Admiralty. Originally, the admiralty ships were leased or advanced by merchant companies.  Later in the 17th century, in order to meet the heavier ships of the line of the Royal Navy on equal terms, ships were built to purpose as heavy warships/ships of the line for continuous naval service.  This innovation is due mainly to Johan de Witt.  To carry out their duties, the admiralties possessed yards, warehouses and offices.

In 1795 the admiralties were replaced by a central Admiralty in the Batavian Republic and later the Kingdom of Holland.  After the French period (1814), it became the Department of the Navy of the Royal Netherlands Navy that is the direct successor to the Dutch Fleet.

Commander-in-Chief of the Dutch Navy 

see Lieutenant Admiral-General

In 1588 Supreme Command of the Fleet was given by the States General to Prince Maurits as commander in chief of the army and navy.  In the case of the navy, his rank was "Admiral General".  Maurice's successors as princes of Orange, as Stadholder of Holland, Zealand, etc., were appointed, in addition to their role as Captain General of the Army, Admiral General of the Navy.  The Admiral General was commander-in-chief of the fleet and chairman of the Admiralty colleges.  In this capacity he was able to provide central direction to naval policy over the 5 separate admiralties.  In practice, as the Stadholder/Admiral General never fought in person with fleet, his day-to-day supreme command of the fleet devolved upon the leading lieutenant-admiral from among the several of that rank from the different admiralties.  This officer functioned as a joint commander ("gezamenlijke bevelvoerder") of the naval admirals, a chief  or as he came to be called the Chef of Ghemaghtigde der Staeten op 's-Landts Vloot (Chief Representative of the States on the Nation's Fleet).  During the Stadholderless times when no Admiral General was appointed the supreme authority of the fleet was the States-General in the person of the Chef. From time to time, especially during the Stadholderless periods, the States General also appointed one or several deputies to accompany the fleet.  It was in this capacity that Cornelis de Witt accompanied the fleet in the Second Anglo-Dutch War and the Raid on the Medway.

The lieutenant-admirals of each admiralty were appointed on the basis of experience and expertise.  Those from the Admiralty of the Maas, as the oldest admiralty, had a claim to command and precedence over those from the other admiralties.  Similarly, the lieutenant-admirals of the Amsterdam Admiralty had a claim to precedence as the representatives of the largest and richest admiralty that fitted out the largest part of the fleet.  The Chef was usually appointed from one of those admiralties.  That role fell first Maarten Tromp.  When de Ruyter was given command of the fleet, his commission as lieutenant-admiral was transferred from Zealand to Amsterdam.

 Piet Hein chef, (26 March 1629 - 18 June 1629)
 Philips van Dorp chef,(1632 -1653)
 Maarten Harpertszoon Tromp chef,(1637-1653)
 Jacob van Wassenaer Obdam chef,(1653-1665)
 Michiel de Ruyter chef,(1665-1676), Lieutenant Admiral-General (rank created for him by William III of Orange) (February 1673 – 1676)
 Cornelis Tromp chef, (1676-1684), Lieutenant Admiral-General (6 February 1679 - 1691)
 Cornelis Evertsen the Youngest chef, (1 April 1684 - 1690)
 Cornelis Tromp chef, (1690-1691)
 Philips van Almonde chef( 1691–1711)

The rank of Lieutenant Admiral General in the Netherlands was created in February 1673 by the Stadholder William III for Michiel de Ruyter to cement his authority and prestige above the other lieutenant-admirals of the Navy and ensure undivided command of the fleet.  De Ruyter had functioned since the Second Anglo-Dutch War with the rank of lieutenant-admiral as commander in chief, without rank to be higher than other lieutenant-admirals.  To put an end to this situation, but also in recognition of his great achievements, De Ruyter received a new grade of Lieutenant Admiral General.  He was not Admiral-General, to emphasize that the authority of the 1672 appointment to Stadholder of  Prince William III was not affected.

After the death of De Ruyter in 1676 this rank was offered to Cornelis Tromp on 6 February 1679 to persuade him to be commander in chief of the Dutch navy.  The delay was due to the fact that Tromp was in the Danish service as their Admiral General.  After the death of Cornelis Tromp in 1691, the rank was not assigned to any other naval officer.  Formally Tromp never held this rank. He died before he could occupy this ramk in Dutch service.  The Stadholder-King William III then ordered that this rank may no longer be used.  Possible reasons for this were because on the one hand the rank of Lieutenant-Admiral-General of the fallen De Ruyter looked too much like his role of Admiral General of the Dutch fleet and, secondly, William had earlier sent De Ruyter with an inadequate fleet to the Mediterranean against a much larger French fleet.

A Fleet Guardian ("Vlootvoogd") was generally also appointed and functioned as a deputy fleet commander.  Although the concept admiral is used in many books, this is not an official rank or title.  It was the name popularly given to commanders of a naval fleet or part of it, whose actual rank could be: admiral, lieutenant-admiral, vice admiral, or  Rear-Admiral .

Financing
Though usually the aspect of financing of a military force is seen as "derivative," in the case of the States Navy, as with the States Army it played an important formative role, and influenced the peculiarities of the organisation also. Unlike the Army, which was made up primarily of mercenaries, the Navy was made up primarily of Dutch natives.

The financial institutions of the Dutch Republic, including its banking system that allowed it raise large amounts of capital at small rates of interest (see Financial history of the Dutch Republic), allowed the Republic to "punch above its weight" in military matters. Without the international "open market" for money the Republic, with its population of about 1.5 million in the 17th century, would simply have lacked the manpower base to compete with countries like Spain (10 million inhabitants in the period in question) and France (20 million).

Seventeenth century 

In the early 17th century, the States fleet was reinforced with armed merchant ships.  The introduction of the line tactics but made agility, sailing capacity, speed and uniformity of the vessels increasingly important.  In 1653 the States-General at the initiative of pensionary Johan de Witt to the construction of sixty ships.  The Seven Provinces was one of these ships were built for the war with England.

Johan de Witt, the councilor pensionary of Holland and leading statesman of the Republic, worked closely with Michiel de Ruyter, who was in command on behalf of the States General of the fleet, and the Amsterdam merchant and member of the Admiralty College David Wildt, who had to provide the money.

In the sixties, was commissioned for a second series of sixty ships.  Thus, a large, standing war fleet of a hundred ships of the line, frigates and lighter vessels formed in the second half of the 17th century.  The largest charter, including the 7 Provinces, the flagship of De Ruyter, was equipped with 80 to 96 guns.

The navy had normally about three to four thousand seamen.  When war threatened thousands of sailors were mustered.  This was generally just for one campaign.  Flag officers and captains were responsible for the recruitment of persons on board.  Officers of the fleet constituted an exception.  Already in the early 17th century a couple of experienced captains were in the permanent employment of the Navy at a salary.  These were called the extraordinary captains.  These captains were also responsible for the victualing of the fleet.  Every captain of a ship bought the supplies from these extraordinary captains at a discount subsidized by the different Admiralties.  The extraordinary captains thus acted as a victualing service.  While cheap to buy, with the subsidy from the Admiralites, the profit on the supplies to the extraordinary captains could amount to thousands of guilders.  The cost and profit on these supplies were the main income of these extraordinary captains.

The sailors came mainly from the proletariat and the multinational population of the port cities.  In 1665 a regiment of soldiers aboard the ship was insitutued under Baron Willem Joseph van Ghent.  These later became the nucleus of the Dutch Marine Corps.

Strategic Mission

During the 17th century the Republic was involved in numerous battles.  The main goal was keeping open the trade routes at sea and the defense of the territory.

Until 1648, Spain was the enemy.  A States fleet destroyed in 1607 the entire Spanish fleet at the Battle of Gibraltar .  Partly as a result of the destruction of the Spanish fleet split in 1608 peace talks launched in 1609 resulted in the Twelve Years' Truce .

The Battle of the Downs in 1639 - in which Lieutenant-Admiral Maarten Tromp and Vice-Admiral Witte de With a Spanish armada of 55 ships, the Second Spanish Armada, defeated - put an end to the Spanish domination at sea.

In addition, the fleet blockaded the Flemish coast and escorted the merchant fleet towards the Baltic Sea .  The close relations between the Swedes and the Dutch angered the Danes.  Many Dutch merchants had settled in Sweden, where they had a large share in the structure of trade and industry.  One of them was Louis de Geer in 1644 a complete naval yield from the Republic, 23 ships with sailors and officers so Fehmarn could be occupied by the Swedes.  The Danes banned in 1640 the export of timber from Norway.  Netherlands Sweden began a war against the Danes, which this the Sound ENDED.  In 1644 and 1645 forced Witte de With, therefore, the Brederode with a huge convoy merchantmen - 702 fleet in the return of the last year - the Sound and thus force a favorable tolverdrag.

Anglo-Dutch Wars 

See:  First Anglo-Dutch War, Second Anglo-Dutch War, Third Anglo-Dutch War, Glorious Revolution, Fourth Anglo-Dutch War

During the 17th century the Republic's maritime expansion aroused more and more envy, especially the British.  Besides bulk trade began increasingly to focus on luxury goods.  The textile industry focused increasingly on refining intermediate goods imported from England.  This allowed the British in 1614, the export of these, known as Cockayne Project .  This failed, however, because the States General banned the import of finished textiles from England.  The English textile industry this was a backlog of decades.  In 1617 England lifted the ban, but the Dutch ban remained in effect.

After the Peace of Westphalia in 1648, the Dutch took the traditional trade of England with Spain and Portugal, which it called a huge resentment.  Netherlands had a huge merchant fleet (with more ships than all other countries in Europe together) and now had a dominant position in the European market in general, and the Baltic trade in particular.  They had further most of the Portuguese territories annexed in the East Indies, including its monopoly on the highly profitable spice trade, and gained more and more influence on maritime trade between Britain and its North American colonies.

The Navigation Acts of 1651 vessels flying the Dutch flag was denied access to English ports as they were carrying goods not coming from the Netherlands.  Because this was the lion's share of the Dutch shipping in England, these laws undermined enormously the commercial position of the Netherlands.  This led to the Anglo-Dutch Wars .  During the First Anglo-Dutch War ( 1652 - 1654 ) the British fleet operations were aimed primarily at the Dutch merchantmen to obstruct free passage.  One example was the Battle of Dungeness in December 1652, in which Maarten Tromp Channel Open managed to keep.  The Battle of Livorno in 1653 under Commander Jan van Galen gave the Dutch prevailed in the Mediterranean Sea, the English trade with the Levant was hereinafter delivered to them.  In the Second Anglo-Dutch War (1665-1667) five major actions took place, almost all the English coast.  In 1667 undertook Michiel de Ruyter are memorable to the Chatham .

The Third Anglo-Dutch War ( 1672 - 1674 ) was part of the Dutch War ( 1672 - 1678 ).  In that year declared England, France, Cologne and Münster war on the Republic, because it meanwhile a superpower had become and was seen as threatening.  Facing the large Anglo-French force majeure at sea States fleet was soon on the defensive.  De Ruyter did however hold off the Dutch coast the enemy thanks to his tactical ingenuity.  During these wars de Ruyter distinguished himself so that he Dutch greatest naval hero was.

With the conclusion of the Treaty of Westminster in 1674 brought an end to the trade wars between the rival navies.  After Governor William III of Orange-Nassau was proclaimed king of England, fought England and the Republic as allies against France.  The battle shifted from the North Sea and the English Channel to the French coast and the Mediterranean, where it was taken against fleet squadrons of Louis XIV and Barbary pirates .  At the end of the War of Spanish Succession ( 1702 - 1713 ) brought an end to the race.

Downturn 

In the 18th century the States fleet could no longer against Britain and France.  An ambitious building program in the '80s was the disastrous course of the Fourth Anglo-Dutch War ( 1780 - 1784 ) is not against England.  Although the Battle of Dogger Bank (1781), led by admiral Johan Zoutman, ended in a draw was in fact a strategic defeat.  At the Paris Peace England was given the freedom of navigation in the East Indian waters.  That was typical of the British rule of the sea, because the Netherlands with the Dutch East Indies right there was huge interest.

After the French 

In the French period of five admiralties were replaced by a central organization, later ministry.  Under William I came to the Royal Dutch Navy, from 1905 officially the Royal Navy .

References

Sources
 
  (2002) War and the State in Early Modern Europe. Spain, the Dutch Republic and Sweden as Fiscal-Military States, 1500–1660. New York, 
   (2006) "Deser landen crijchsvolck" Het Staatse leger en de militaire revoluties (1588–1688). Amsterdam, 
  (2010) Pike and Shot Tactics, 1590–1660. Botley, 
   (2006) Krijgsvolk. Militaire professionalisering en het ontstaan van het Staatse leger, 1568–1590. Dissertation, Amsterdam, 
  (2008) The Founding of the Dutch Republic. War, Finance, and Politics in Holland, 1572–1588. Oxford, 
  Het staatsche leger, 1568–1795, bewerkt door F.J.G. ten Raa en F. de Bas (J.W. Wijn) Eight vols. Breda, 1910–1950
   (1991) "De militie van den staat" : het leger van de Republiek der Verenigde Nederlanden. Amsterdam, 
  (1976-1978): Maritieme geschiedenis der Nederlanden, De Boer Maritiem, Bussum
 Charles Ralph Boxer: The Anglo-Dutch Wars of the 17th Century, Her Majesty's Stationery Office, London 1974.
 Alfred Thayer Mahan: Der Einfluß der Seemacht auf die Geschichte 1660–1812, Herford 1967.
 N.A.M. Rodger: The Command of the Ocean: A Naval History of Britain 1649—1815, New York, 2004 
 P. G. Rogers: The Dutch on the Medway Oxford University Press, Oxford 1970, .
 Geyl, Pieter. Orange & Stuart 1641-1672 (1969)
 Israel, Jonathan Ie. The Dutch Republic: its rise, greatness and fall, 1477-1806 (1995), pp 713–26, 766–76, 796–806. The Dutch political perspective.
 Herbert H. Rowen, John de Witt, Grand Pensionary of Holland, 1625-1672. Princeton, N.J.: Princeton University Press, 1978, which is summarized in
 Herbert H. Rowen, "John de Witt: Statesman of the "True Freedom"". Cambridge University Press, 2003.
 Herbert H. Rowen, The Princes of Orange: the Stadholders in the Dutch Republic. Cambridge and New York: Cambridge University Press, 1988.
 Herbert H. Rowen, The Princes of Orange: the Stadholders in the Dutch Republic. Cambridge and New York: Cambridge University Press, 2003.
 Petrus Johannes Blok, "History of the People of the Netherlands". New York:  G. P. Putnam's sons, 1898.
 Pieter Geyl, "Orange and Stuart, 1641-1672". Scribner, 1970.
 Jonathan I. Israel, "The Dutch Republic: Its Rise, Greatness, and Fall, 1477–1806" Oxford University Press, 1995. 
Peter de la Court:

External links 
 3decks - Naval Sailing Warfare History, Dutch First Rates
 History Bruzelius.info

Naval history of the Netherlands
Dutch Republic
Organizations disestablished in 1795